Nsawkaw is a town and is the capital of Tain district of the Bono region of Ghana.
The hometown of the native people of Nsoko was Hani Begho (pronounced Bew). It has a population of about 6000. 
History teaches that the people of Nsoko emerged from a hole and first settled at Hani. Tradition further recalls that during their stay at Hani, a self-styled creator came with his mother called ASO to stay with them. Sooner than later, the mother died and when he (the self-styed creator) was informed about the death, he exclaimed “Asoko”, meaning ASO is gone, and eventually became Nsoko which has been Anglicized Nsawkaw. In 2018, the Omanhene of Nsawkaw was Okogyeaman Nana Duodu Ampem II.

References

Populated places in the Bono Region